Abel Lake was a small lake in the Westland region of the South Island of New Zealand. A short stream linked the lake with the Perth River. The lake was (as of May 2017) was likely displaced with alluvial / glacial rock or the outlet was lowered by natural erosion or manually by gold prospectors.

References

Westland District
Lakes of the West Coast, New Zealand
West Coast Gold Rush